The Double O is a 1921 American silent Western film directed by Roy Clements and starring Jack Hoxie, Steve Clemente and Evelyn Nelson.

Cast
 Jack Hoxie as Happy Hanes
 Steve Clemente as Cholo Pete 
 William Berke as Mat Haley 
 Ed La Niece as Jim
 Evelyn Nelson as Frances Powell

References

External links
 

1921 films
1921 Western (genre) films
Films directed by Roy Clements
Arrow Film Corporation films
Silent American Western (genre) films
1920s English-language films
1920s American films